The Department of Materials Science and Metallurgy (DMSM) is a large research and teaching division of the University of Cambridge. Since 2013 it has been located in West Cambridge, having previously occupied several buildings on the New Museums Site in the centre of Cambridge.

Following the changes to academic titles in 2021/2022 at the University of Cambridge, the academic staff of the Department of Materials Science and Metallurgy no longer use the academic titles of Reader and Lecturer.  The list below reflects the new academic titles.

Academic staff
 Professorial staff include:

 Serena Best, CBE, FREng, Professor of Materials Science
 Ruth Cameron, Professor of Materials Science
 Manish Chhowalla, Goldsmiths' Professor of Materials Science
 Judith Driscoll, FREng, Professor of Materials Science
 Caterina Ducati, Professor of Nanomaterials
 Rachel Evans, Professor of Materials Chemistry
 James Elliott, Professor of Macromolecular Materials Science
 Lindsay Greer, Professor of Materials Science
 Louise Hirst, Professor of Materials Physics (jointly appointed with the Cavendish Laboratory)
 Nick Jones, Professor of Metallurgy
 Sohini Kar-Narayan, Professor of Device & Energy Materials
 Neil Mathur, Professor of Materials Physics
 Paul Midgley, FRS, Professor of Materials Science (Current Head of Department)
 Rachel Oliver, FREng, Professor of Materials Science
 Chris Pickard, Sir Alan Cottrell Professor of Materials Science
 Cathie Rae, Professor of Superalloys
 Emilie Ringe, Professor of Synthetic and Natural Nanomaterials (jointly appointed with the Department of Earth Sciences)
 Howard Stone, Professor of Metallurgy
Jason WA Robinson, Professor of Materials Physics

 Assistant and Associate Professorial staff include:

 Thomas D Bennett, Assistant Professor
 Giuliana di Martino, Assistant Professor
 Bartomeu Monserrat, Assistant Professor, Gianna Angelopoulos Lecturer in Computational Materials Science
 Xavier Moya, Assistant Professor

 Staff dedicated to teaching include:

 Jess Gwynne, Associate Teaching Professor, Director of Undergraduate Teaching
 Rob Thompson, Teaching Associate

Heads of Department

 Professor R.S Hutton -1944
 Professor Wesley Austin 1945-1958
 Professor Sir Alan Cottrell FRS 1958-1966
 Professor Sir Robert Honeycombe FREng FRS 1966-84
 Professor Derek Hull FREng FRS 1984-1991
 Professor Sir Colin Humphreys, CBE FREng FRS 1991-1996
 Professor Alan Windle FRS 1996-2000
 Professor Derek Fray FRS FREng 2000-2005
 Professor Alan Lindsay Greer 2005-2013
 Professor Mark Blamire 2013-2018
 Professor Paul Midgley FRS 2018-2020 
 Professor Ruth Cameron, Professor James Elliott, and Professor Jason Robinson 2020-  (current)

Research Themes
Current research spans seven themes in which there are current materials challenges to overcome:
 Aerospace materials
 Information Communication Technologies
 Innovative Characterisation
 Materials Discovery
 Materials for Energy and Sustainability
 Materials for Healthcare
 Novel Design and Processing

Research Groups

Research is organised into the following groups.
 Device Materials Group
 Electron Microscopy Group
 Cambridge Centre for Gallium Nitride
 Hybrid Materials Group
 
 Centre for Materials Physics
 Materials Theory Group
 Cambridge Centre for Medical Materials
 Microstructural Kinetics Group
 Optical Nanomaterials Group
 Photoactive Materials Group
 Rolls-Royce University Technology Centre in Advanced Materials
 Space Voltaics Group

Spinout Companies
 2019 - Barocal Ltd - developing new heating and cooling technologies to satisfy low-carbon requirements
 2018 - Plastometrex Ltd - Profilometry-based Indentation Plastometry (PIP) - a revolutionary new approach to the mechanical testing of metals
 2018 - Porotech - specialising in the development of Gallium Nitride material technology
 2015 - Paragraf Ltd - novel deposition of graphene onto semiconductors
 2010 - CamGaN (now part of Plessey) - GaN on Silicon LED technology (low cost, low energy lighting)
 2007 - Inotec AMD - innovative topical oxygen therapy for wound healing
 2004 - Q-flo (merged with Plasan, CNT fibres now commercialised by Tortech) - ultra-long CNT fibres 
 2004 - Camfridge - energy-efficient and gas-free magnetic cooling
 2001 - Metalysis  - commercialisation of the FFC Cambridge Process. Reduction of metal oxides and ores into pure metals and alloys
 1989 - CMD Ltd (became part of Accelerys, now part of Biovia Dassault Systems) - X-ray modelling software

Alumni and former staff
Notable alumni and former staff include:

 Sir  Harry Bhadeshia FRS FREng
 Alan Cottrell, FRS,
 Robert W. Cahn FRS,
 Robert Honeycombe
 Derek Fray FRS FREng
 Sir Colin Humphreys, CBE FREng FRS
 Alan Windle FRS
 Charles Heycock FRS
 Sir Graeme Davies FREng
 William Bonfield CBE FRS FREng
 Michael F. Ashby CBE FRS FREng
 Julia King, Baroness Brown of Cambridge DBE FREng

See also 

 DoITPoMS
 Department of Materials, University of Oxford
 Department of Materials, Imperial College London

References

Departments in the Faculty of Physics and Chemistry, University of Cambridge
Cambridge, University of